Philip Kennedy (born 1960) is an Irish retired hurler who played as a midfielder for the Tipperary senior team.

A two-time All-Ireland-winning captain in the under-21 grade, Kennedy made his first appearance for the senior team during the 1981-82 National League and became a regular member of the team over the next few seasons. During that time the inter-county team did not claim any honours at senior level.

At club level Kennedy was a one-time county club championship with the Nenagh Éire Óg club.

References

1960 births
Living people
Nenagh Éire Óg hurlers
Tipperary inter-county hurlers